Alan Perreiah (born 11 April 1937) is an American philosopher and an historian of philosophy, with a special interest  the development of logic in Western Europe from the fifth to fifteenth century. He is best known for his research on the 15th century Italian philosopher Paul of Venice. He is a former Professor and Director of Undergraduate Studies in the Department of Philosophy at the University of Kentucky.

Early life and education
Alan was born in Los Angeles, California. He received a BA in the Arts from Loyola Marymount University. He received an MA in the Arts from Marquette University. He received his PhD from Indiana University in 1967.

Career
In 1965 Perreiah was awarded a Fulbright fellowship. He began as an assistant professor of philosophy at the University of Wisconsin in 1967 before moving to Lexington to become an associate professor at the University of Kentucky. Perreiah eventually became chairman of the department of philosophy there in 1982. 

In the early 1980s, as part of the National Endowment for the Humanities, Perreiah moved to Italy to study the Italian philosopher Paul of Venice. Perreiah would eventually publish multiple books and articles about the figure.

Books
 Paul of Venice: Logica Magna, "Treatise on Suppositions," an edition, translation and introduction to the Tractatus de suppositionibus, New York: Franciscan Institute Publications, 1971.
 Paulus Venetus: Logica Parva, an English translation of the 1472 Edition with introductory essays and notes,  Munich: Philosophia Verlag and the Catholic University of America Press, 1984.
 Paul of Venice: A Bibliographical Guide, including a census of the manuscripts, Bowling Green, Ohio: Philosophy Documentation Center, 1986.
 Paulus Venetus Logica Parva: First Critical Edition From the Manuscripts with Introduction and Commentary, Brill, 2001.
 Renaissance Truths: Humanism, Scholasticism and the Search for the Perfect Language, Routledge, 2014.

References

1937 births
American philosophers
American historians of philosophy
Living people